Sibianor victoriae is a jumping spider species in the genus Sibianor that lives in Kenya and South Africa. It was first identified in 2001.

References

Salticidae
Spiders described in 2001
Spiders of Africa